The Macintosh Classic II (also sold as the Performa 200) is a personal computer designed, manufactured and sold by Apple Computer, Inc. from October 1991 to September 1993. Like the Macintosh SE/30, the Classic II was powered by a 16 MHz Motorola 68030 CPU and 40 or 80 MB hard disk, but in contrast to the SE/30, it was limited by a 16-bit data bus (the SE/30 had a 32-bit data bus) and a 10 MB memory ceiling. The slower data bus resulted in the Classic II being 30% slower than the SE/30.

While the Classic II shares a case with the earlier Classic, architecturally it has more similarities to the Macintosh LC. The use of custom ICs, identical to those used in the LC, enabled the Classic II to have a lower component count than older Macs. Unlike the LC and the SE/30 before it, the Classic II does not have an internal Processor Direct Slot, making it the second slotless desktop Macintosh after the Classic.

The Classic II was one of the three machines Apple repackaged as a Macintosh Performa when the brand was introduced in September 1992. Called the "Performa 200", it was sold with the same specifications as the original Classic II, with the addition of a speaker grille on the left side for enhanced sound. A number of changes to the packaged software were included, such as the At Ease desktop alternative which aimed to provide a simpler user interface than the standard Macintosh Finder.  The exact software included tended to vary from one retailer to the next. It was initially offered at a retail price of about $1,250 USD.

The Classic II is the last black-and-white compact Macintosh, and the last desktop Macintosh to include an external floppy disk drive port. Apple discontinued support for the Classic II on January 1, 2001.

Models 
 Macintosh Classic II: Sold in two configurations:
2/40: 2 MB RAM, 40 MB HDD. USD $1,899.
4/80: 4 MB RAM, 80 MB HDD. USD $2,399.
 Macintosh Performa 200:

Hardware 

Processor: 16 MHz (15.6672 MHz) Motorola 68030 (32-bit internally, 16-bit bus), with an optional Motorola 68882 FPU

RAM: 2 MB, expandable to 10 MB using two 100 ns 30-pin SIMMs

Display: 9" monochrome screen, 512 × 342 pixels

Audio: 8-bit mono 22 kHz

Hard drive: 40 or 80 MB

Floppy: 1.44 MB double-sided

Addressing: 24-bit or 32-bit

Battery: 3.6 V lithium

Expansion: Connectors on the rear panel include an ADB port for keyboard and mouse, two mini-DIN-8 RS-422 serial ports, DB-25 SCSI, DB-19 External floppy drive, and two 3.5 mm minijack audio sockets for audio in and headphone out.

The Classic II has a 50-pin internal expansion slot intended for either an FPU co-processor or additional ROM. Due to not being designed to be used for any other purpose, the socket is unsuitable for use as a general expansion slot. Apple never produced an expansion card of any kind for this slot, although at least one third-party FPU was available: the FastMath Classic II by Applied Engineering. and Sonnet offered a synchronous (16 MHz) and asynchronous (50 MHz) 68882 FPU.

Gallery

Timelines

References

External links
 Classic II (Performa 200)Information pages at Mac512.com

Classic II
Classic II
Classic II
Computer-related introductions in 1991